TINA-C stands for Telecommunication Information Networking Architecture Consortium. It was an attempt (started in 1992) by several actors in the telecommunication world to define, design and realize a software architecture for the telecommunication infrastructure. The consortium has defined a number of specifications and has organized several experiments and demos. 

TINA-C is partly based on the Advanced Networked Systems Architecture (ANSA) standard developed by Andrew Herbert.

From 1993-1997 TINA specifications where developed by a core team of experts residing in Red Bank, New Jersey. Core team members were employees of the member companies assigned to work for the consortium. From 1998-2000 the consortium consisted of a Technical Architecture Board that met frequently, with work being conducted in several working groups.

The consortium disbanded in 2000.

Member Companies
The following organizations were at one time members of TINA-C:

Alcatel
Alcatel
AT&T
Bellcore
BT
Deutsche Telekom
DEC
Ericsson
France Telecom
GPT
HP
IBM
Korea Telecom
KPN
Lucent
Nippon Telegraph and Telephone
Nokia
Siemens
SPRINT
 STL research lab for Nortel Networks
Telefonica
Telecom Italia / CSELT
Telstra
Telenor

Bibliography 
 Appeldorn, Menso, Roberto Kung, and Roberto Saracco. "Tmn+ in= tina." IEEE Communications Magazine 31.3 (1993): 78-85.

External links
TINA-C Official website

Telecommunications organizations